Andronymus neander, the common dart or nomad dart, is a butterfly of the family Hesperiidae. It is found in tropical Africa. The habitat consists of moist woodland, forest margins and riparian vegetation, from sea level up to altitudes of 2,400 metres.

The wingspan is 38–46 mm for males and 42–48 mm for females. Adults are on wing from September to April in South Africa. There are continuous generations year-round further north.

The larvae feed on Brachystegia species (including Brachystegia spiciformis), Afzelia africana and Acridocarpus smeathmannii.

Subspecies
Andronymus neander neander (Senegal, Gambia, Sierra Leone, Liberia, Ivory Coast, Ghana, Benin, Nigeria, Cameroon, Gabon, Congo, Central African Republic, Angola, Democratic Republic of the Congo, Uganda, Kenya, Tanzania, Malawi, Zambia, Mozambique, Zimbabwe, Botswana, northern Namibia, Eswatini, South Africa: Limpopo Province, Mpumalanga, Gauteng, KwaZulu-Natal)
Andronymus neander thomasi Riley, 1928 (São Tomé and Príncipe)

References

Butterflies described in 1884
Erionotini
Butterflies of Africa